Christian Leandro Tamayo Saavedra (born ) is a Colombian male track cyclist, riding for the national team. He competed in the sprint and team sprint event at the 2011 UCI Track Cycling World Championships.

References

External links
 Profile at cyclingarchives.com

1991 births
Living people
Colombian track cyclists
Colombian male cyclists
Place of birth missing (living people)
Cyclists at the 2011 Pan American Games
Pan American Games medalists in cycling
Pan American Games bronze medalists for Colombia
Medalists at the 2011 Pan American Games
20th-century Colombian people
21st-century Colombian people
Competitors at the 2010 Central American and Caribbean Games
Competitors at the 2010 South American Games
South American Games gold medalists for Colombia
South American Games silver medalists for Colombia
South American Games medalists in cycling